Marc Okrand (born July 3, 1948) is an American linguist. His professional work is in Native American languages, and he is well known as the creator of the Klingon language in the Star Trek science fiction franchise.

Linguistics
As a linguist, Okrand worked with Native American languages. He earned a bachelor's degree from the University of California, Santa Cruz in 1970.  His 1977 doctoral dissertation from the University of California, Berkeley, was on the grammar of Mutsun, an extinct Ohlone language formerly spoken in the coastal areas of north-central California. His dissertation was supervised by pioneering linguist Mary Haas. From 1975 to 1978, he taught undergraduate linguistics courses at the University of California, Santa Barbara, before taking a post-doctoral fellowship at the Smithsonian in Washington, D.C., in 1978. 

After that, Okrand took a job at the National Captioning Institute, where he worked on the first closed-captioning system for hearing-impaired television viewers. Until his retirement in 2013, Okrand served as one of the directors for Live Captioning at the National Captioning Institute and as President of the board of directors of WSC Avant Bard (formerly the Washington Shakespeare Company) in Arlington, Virginia, which planned to stage "an evening of Shakespeare in Klingon" in 2010.

Star Trek
While coordinating closed captioning for the Oscars award show in 1982, Okrand met the producer for the movie Star Trek II: The Wrath of Khan. His first work was dubbing in Vulcan language dialogue for Star Trek II: The Wrath of Khan, since the actors had already been filmed talking in English. He was then hired by Paramount Pictures to develop the Klingon language and coach the actors using it in Star Trek III: The Search for Spock, Star Trek V: The Final Frontier, Star Trek VI: The Undiscovered Country. He was later hired for the use of the Romulan and Vulcan languages in the Star Trek film in 2009. He also created Klingon dialogue for that movie, but those scenes were cut. He was involved in Star Trek Into Darkness, but only during post-production.

Okrand is the author of three books about Klingon – The Klingon Dictionary (first published 1985, revised enlarged edition 1992), The Klingon Way (1996), and Klingon for the Galactic Traveler (1997) – as well as two audio courses: Conversational Klingon (1992) and Power Klingon (1993). He has also co-authored the libretto of an opera in the Klingon language: , debuting at The Hague in September 2010. He speaks Klingon, but notes that others have attained greater fluency.

In 2018 he developed the language for the Kelpien race in the second season of Star Trek: Discovery (first appearing in the third Short Treks episode "The Brightest Star").

Atlantis: The Lost Empire
In 2001, Okrand created the Atlantean language for the Disney film Atlantis: The Lost Empire. He was also used as an early facial model for the protagonist's character design.

Notes

References

External links
 
 Interview with Marc Okrand in the Wall Street Journal

1948 births
American opera librettists
Constructed language creators
Creators of writing systems
Linguists from the United States
Linguists of Klingon
Living people
People from Los Angeles
University of California, Berkeley alumni
University of California, Santa Cruz alumni